The Chasnala mining disaster was a disaster that happened on 27 December 1975 in a coal mine in Chasnala near Dhanbad in the Indian state of Jharkhand. An explosion in the mine followed by flooding killed 375 miners.

Accident 
The disaster was caused by an explosion at 1:35pm that weakened the wall between the mine pit and another, abandoned mine above it that was full of water. The miners were killed by debris, drowning, and the force of the flood. By the time bodies could be recovered, they were typically identifiable only by the number on their lamp helmets. The first body was recovered 26 days after the accident occurred.

With a death toll of 375, Chasnala was India's deadliest mining accident.

Investigation and consequences 
The Indian Iron and Steel Company (IISCO), which owned the mine, said it conformed to international standards. Miners blamed management negligence. There was also concern that the barrier between the two mines had been unsafely thin and that there was inadequate safety equipment. In particular, the mine had no high pressure pump. Instead, pumps had to be brought in from the Soviet Union and Poland to try to remove the water. 

Ujjal Narayan Sinha, the former Chief Justice of the Patna High Court, was appointed to investigate the circumstances of the disaster. He submitted his report on 24 March 1977. Consequently, four IISCO officials were prosecuted for negligence. By the time the case was decided in 2012 (37 years later), two of them had died. The surviving officials, manager Ramanuj Bhattacharya and agent, planning and group security officer Dipak Sarkar, were each sentenced to one year's imprisonment and a fine of ₹5,000. They were released on bail and had a month to appeal.

A memorial to the dead (Shaheed Smarak) was built outside the mine entrance and moved to a park in 1997.

In popular culture 
The film Kaala Patthar depicts the tragedy.

See also 
 2018 Meghalaya mining accident

References

Coal mining disasters in India
1975 in India
Mining disasters in India
History of Jharkhand (1947–present)
Disasters in Jharkhand
Dhanbad district
1975 disasters in India
Mining in Jharkhand
1970s in Jharkhand